Ambohimanana is a village and rural commune in the Brickaville district (or: Vohibinany (district)) in the Atsinanana Region, Madagascar.

References

Populated places in Atsinanana